Sir Mark Aitchison Young  (楊慕琦, 30 June 1886 – 12 May 1974) was a British administrator who became the Governor of Hong Kong during the years immediately before and after the Japanese occupation of the territory.

Early life, service in war
Young was the third son of colonial administrator William Mackworth Young and his second wife, Frances Mary, daughter of Sir Robert Eyles Egerton, KCSI, JP, Lieutenant-Governor of the Punjab from 1877 to 1882, Sir Robert Egerton was nephew of the 8th and 9th Grey Egerton baronets. Mark Young's paternal grandfather was Sir George Young, 2nd Baronet.
Young was educated at Eton College and King's College, Cambridge. He entered the Ceylon Civil Service in 1909 and served in the British Army with the Rifle Brigade (Prince Consort's Own) during World War I from 1915.

Colonial administration
Young served as principal assistant colonial secretary of Ceylon (from 1923 to 1925 under Sir Cecil Clementi and Murchison Fletcher from 1925 to 1928), then as colonial secretary of Sierra Leone from 1928 to 1930. From 1930 to 1933, he served as chief secretary to the Government of the British Mandate of Palestine.

From 5 August 1933 to March 1938, he served as governor and commander-in-chief of Barbados. From November 1937 to February 1938, he served in the Government of Trinidad and Tobago. Then from 1938 to 1941, he served as governor and commander-in-chief of the Tanganyika Territory British Mandate.

Hong Kong governor, prisoner of war
On 10 September 1941 Young was appointed Governor of Hong Kong. Japanese forces already occupied the Chinese mainland adjoining Hong Kong as part of their ongoing war with China, and early in Young's term Hong Kong came under the threat of Japanese invasion.

At 08:00, 8 December 1941, several hours after Pearl Harbor was attacked, Hong Kong came under fire by Imperial Japanese Forces. The battle lasted for 17 days, and ended when Young surrendered the colony to the Japanese General Takashi Sakai on 25 December, known as the 'Black Christmas' by Hong Kong people, who were then subject to Japanese rule for the next 3 years and 8 months. Young rebuffed several attempts by General Maltby and others in the military to ask for terms and discuss surrender as early as the 18th. This was in part based on clear instruction by Churchill directly to Young, advising him that "Every Part of (Hong Kong) Island must be fought over and the enemy resisted with the utmost stubbornness. Every day that you are able to maintain your resistance you help the Allied cause all over the world."

Young was a prisoner of war in Japanese hands from December 1941 to August 1945. He was initially held in the Peninsula Hotel and subsequently incarcerated in a prisoner of war camp in Stanley, on the southern shores of Hong Kong Island. Shortly thereafter, he was later transferred, with other high-ranking Allied captives, including General Maltby, to a series of POW camps in Shanghai, Taiwan, and Japan, then to a camp near the Chinese-Mongolian border, and finally to a location near Mukden (modern Shenyang) Manchuria, until his liberation at war's end. Despite being the colony's highest-ranking official, Young was mistreated by his captors. Japan was defeated and surrendered in September 1945 and the British regained control of the colony.

Post-Japanese occupation governorship
Young resumed his duties as Governor of Hong Kong on 1 May 1946, after having spent some time recuperating in England. After returning, he proposed political reforms that would have allowed Hong Kong residents to directly choose a 30-member representative Legislative Council. He envisaged that the new Council would handle everyday affairs and that its decisions would be immune to the Governor's veto. Young, echoing the plan of Sir Geoffry Northcote, called for the promotion of local Chinese civil servants to the senior posts. These initiatives were eventually abandoned under the term of Governor Sir Alexander Grantham, an ardent conservative. Young retired from the governorship in 1947.

Personal life
Young and his wife, Josephine Mary, had two sons and two daughters.

Young, Sir William Robinson and Christopher Patten are the only governors not to have been honoured in Hong Kong after completing their post. This is probably because most of Young's time in Hong Kong was spent as prisoner of war, with only a brief period from 1946 to 1947 as governor.

His brothers Gerard Mackworth Young (also director of the British School at Athens) and Sir Hubert Winthrop Young, KCMG, were also colonial administrators.

Honours
 Companion of the Order of St Michael and St George (C.M.G.) (1931)
 Knight Commander of the Order of St Michael and St George (K.C.M.G.) - Sir (1934)
 Knight Grand Cross of the Order of St Michael and St George (G.C.M.G.) - Sir (1946)

References

 Battle For Hong Kong December 1941 by Philip Cracknell JULY 2019.  Publisher AMBERLEY.

External links
Hong Kong Photo 1946–1947 by Hedda Morrison

1886 births
1974 deaths
Military personnel of British India
Governors of Hong Kong
Governors of Barbados
British High Commissioners of Palestine
British Army personnel of World War I
Rifle Brigade officers
World War II political leaders
History of Hong Kong
Battle of Hong Kong
Hong Kong people of World War II
Knights Grand Cross of the Order of St Michael and St George
Alumni of King's College, Cambridge
Colonial Administrative Service officers
Governors of Tanganyika (territory)
World War II prisoners of war held by Japan
Colonial Secretaries of Sierra Leone
People from British Ceylon
Chief Secretaries of Palestine